Tum Mere Kya Ho (English: Who are you to me?) is a 2015 Pakistani romantic drama serial directed by Siraj-ul-Haque, written by Mehrunisa Mustaqeem Khan, produced by Abdullah Kadwani and Asad Qureshi under the 7th Sky Entertainment banner. The serial stars Sajjal Ali, Mikaal Zulfiqar, Kiran Haq and Umair Rana and was released in October 2015 on PTV Home.

It was the fourth on-screen together appearance of Mikaal Zulfiqar and Kiran Haq after their appearances in Tum Meray Hi Rehna, Sangat and Maan.

Synopsis
When Ahmer (Mikaal Zulfiqar) loses his wife Sadia (Mehreen Raheel) in a fatal car accident, he becomes the sole caretaker of his young daughter Hira (Eshal). Meanwhile his employee Anwar, who is about to get his daughter Hina (Sajjal Ali) married, is unable to meet the demands of his daughter's future in-laws and is forced to cancel the wedding. Unable to deal with the shock, Anwar suffers a fatal heart attack. Ahmer steps up and takes the responsibility of supporting Hina.

At the same time, Ahmer’s old friend Maheen (Kiran Haq) leaves her husband and son, and enters Ahmer's life again. Unable to stand Ahmer’s affection for Hina, Maheen plots to get rid of Hina. When Hina also starts gets involved with her classfellow Mustaqeem, Maheen sees an opportunity to make permanent place for herself in Ahmer’s life. Ahmer is torn between Maheen's advances and his responsibility and love for Hina.

Tum Mere Kya Ho is the story of unrequited love and the difficult choices life leaves us with.

Cast 
 Mikaal Zulfiqar as Ahmer
 Sajjal Ali as Hina
 Kiran Haq as Maheen
 Umair Rana as Khalid
 Muhammad Mubarik Ali as Mustaqeem 
 Raheela Agha as Nunhi
 Sehrish Khan as Rehman Begum
 Dania Anwar
 Eshal as Hira (child star)
 Ali Muhammad
 Roohi Khan
 Naima Khan
 Saima Saeed Malik
 Humayun Gul as Mr. Ahmed
 Wahaj Khan
 Ali Kumar
 Khalid Butt
 Hooriya Ali

Soundtrack 
The original soundtrack of Tum Mere Kya Ho is composed by Shani Arshad and sung by Nabeel Shaukat and Tehreem.

Release 
It is also available on Amazon Prime Video.

See also 
 2016 in Pakistani television
Watch 'Tum Mere Kya Ho' on Amazon Prime now.

References 

Pakistani drama television series